Selin (also Romanized as Selīn) is a village in Shalyar Rural District, Uraman District, Sarvabad County,Kurdistan Iran. At the 2006 census, its population was 910, in 194 families. The village is populated by Kurds.

References 

Towns and villages in Sarvabad County
Kurdish settlements in Kurdistan Province